In Greek mythology, Acessamenus (Ancient Greek: Ἀκεσσαμενοῖο or Ἀκεσσάμενος) was a king of Pieria. He was known as the founder and eponym of Akesamenai, a city in Macedonia.

Mythology
In the Iliad, Acessamenus is mentioned as father of several daughters, the eldest of whom, Periboea, had a son Pelagon by the river god Axius; Pelagon, in his turn, was the father of the Trojan ally Asteropaios.

 "Meanwhile the son of Peleus (i.e. Achilles) bearing his far-shadowing spear leapt, eager to slay him, upon Asteropaeus, son of Pelegon, that was begotten of wide-flowing Axius and Periboea, eldest of the daughters of Acessamenus; for with her lay the deep-eddying River."

Notes

References 

 Homer, The Iliad with an English Translation by A.T. Murray, Ph.D. in two volumes. Cambridge, MA., Harvard University Press; London, William Heinemann, Ltd. 1924. Online version at the Perseus Digital Library.
 Homer, Homeri Opera in five volumes. Oxford, Oxford University Press. 1920. Greek text available at the Perseus Digital Library.
 Stephanus of Byzantium, Stephani Byzantii Ethnicorum quae supersunt, edited by August Meineike (1790-1870), published 1849. A few entries from this important ancient handbook of place names have been translated by Brady Kiesling. Online version at the Topos Text Project.

Kings in Greek mythology

Characters in the Iliad
Mythology of Macedonia (region)